Time in Lebanon is given by Eastern European Time (EET) (UTC+02:00) or Eastern European Summer Time (EEST) (UTC+03:00) during the summer.

References

Lebanon